Eccellenza Lazio is the regional Eccellenza football division for clubs in Lazio, Italy. It is competed amongst 36 teams, in two different groups (A and B). The winners of the Groups are promoted to Serie D. The club who finishes second also have the chance to gain promotion, they are entered into a national play-off which consists of two rounds.

Champions
Here are the past champions of the Lazio Eccellenza, organised into their respective group.

Group A

1991–92 Civita Castellana  		
1992–93 Fiumicino
1993–94 Civitavecchia Calcio
1994–95 Guidonia
1995–96 Fiumicino
1996–97 Ladispoli
1997–98 Fregene
1998–99 Fortitudo Nepi
1999–2000 Monterotondo
2000–01 Albalonga
2001–02 Cisco Collatino
2002–03 Ostia Mare
2003–04 Sorianese 	
2004–05 Pisoniano
2005–06 Anziolavinio
2006–07 Bassano Romano
2007–08 Civitavecchia Calcio
2008–09 Pomezia Calcio
2009–10 Fidene
2010–11 Palestrina
2011–12 Ostia Mare
2012–13 Santa Maria delle Mole
2013–14 Viterbese
2014–15 Albalonga
2015–16 Monterosi
2016–17 S.F.F. Atletico
2017–18 Vis Artena
2018–19 Team Nuova Florida
2019–20 Montespaccato
2020–21 Real Monterotondo Scalo
2021–22 Pomezia

Group B

1991–92 Cynthia Genzano
1992–93 Ferentino
1993–94 Ceccano 	
1994–95 Vis Velletri	
1995–96 Terracina 	
1996–97 Real Piedimonte 	
1997–98 La Setina Sezze 	
1998–99 Lanuvio Campoleone 
1999–2000 Aprilia	
2000–01 Ferentino
2001–02 Anagni Fontana 		
2002–03 Frascati Lupa G.I.O.C.
2003–04 Ferentino
2004–05 Cassino
2005–06 Morolo	
2006–07 Lupa Frascati
2007–08 Pol. Gaeta
2008–09 Virtus Latina
2009–10 Zagarolo
2010–11 Sora
2011–12 San Cesareo
2012–13 Monterotondo Lupa
2013–14 Lupa Castelli Romani
2014–15 Trastevere
2015–16 Città di Ciampino
2016–17 Cassino
2017–18 Città di Anagni
2018–19 Pro Calcio Tor Sapienza
2019–20 Insieme Ausonia
2020–21 Unipomezia
2021–22 Tivoli

Group C
2020–21 Tivoli
2021–22 Lupa Frascati A.S.D.

References

External links
Some Club Histories In the League

Sport in Lazio
Lazio
Sports leagues established in 1991
1991 establishments in Italy
Football clubs in Italy
Association football clubs established in 1991